Dolphinholme Worsted Mill is a textile mill located in the village of Dolphinholme, Lancashire. The Worsted Spinning Mill was built in 1795 by Thomas Hinde (junior), a slave trader who had followed his father, Thomas Hinde (senior), into that business before establishing the mill. Samuel Clegg installed gas lighting in the mill in 1811. The remains of this are considered the oldest remnants of a water-filled gas holder tank.

In 2020 the remains of the building received scheduled monument status.

Gallery

See also
Scheduled monuments in Lancashire

References

Buildings and structures in the Borough of Wyre
Former textile mills in the United Kingdom
Scheduled monuments in Lancashire
Textile mills in Lancashire